Nizhny Kuchuk is a rural locality (a selo) and the administrative center of Nizhnekuchuksky Selsoviet of Blagoveshchensky District, Altai Krai, Russia. The population was 464 as of 2016. There are 6 streets.

Geography 
Nizhny Kuchuk is located east of Lake Kuchuk, by the Kuchuk River, 18 km south of Blagoveshchenka (the district's administrative centre) by road. Stepnoye Ozero is the nearest rural locality.

Ethnicity 
The village is inhabited by Russians, as well as other ethnic groups.

References 

Rural localities in Blagoveshchensky District, Altai Krai